Laurus is a 2012 Russian novel by Eugene Vodolazkin set in the fifteenth and sixteenth centuries. It won the Big Book Award and the Yasnaya Polyana Book Award. It was translated into English in 2015 by Lisa C. Hayden.

References 

2012 Russian novels
Novels set in the 15th century
Novels set in the 16th century